Entonyssidae is a small family of mites in the order Mesostigmata.

Species
Entonyssidae contains seven genera, with nine recognized species:

 Genus Entonyssus Ewing, 1922
 Entonyssus halli Ewing, 1922
 Entonyssus koreansis Noh & Sohn, 1991
 Entonyssus squamatus Fain, Kutzer & Fordinal, 1983
 Genus Cobrabyssus Fain, 1960
 Cobrabyssus schoutedeni (Radford, 1953)
 Genus Entophiophaga Fain, 1960
 Entophiophaga congolensis Fain, 1960
 Entophiophaga scaphiophis Fain, 1960
 Entophiophaga natriciterei Fain, 1960
 Entophiophaga colubricola Fain, 1960
 Genus Entophioptes Fain, 1960
 Entophioptes liophis Fain, 1960
 Genus Hamertonia Türk, 1947
 Hamertonia bedfordi (Radford, 1937)
 Genus Ophiopneumicola Hubbard, 1938
 Ophiopneumicola colubri Hubbard, 1938
 Genus Viperacarus Fain, 1960
 Viperacarus europaeus Fain, 1960

References

Mesostigmata
Acari families